Horlivka, also known as Gorlovka, is a city of regional significance in Donetsk Oblast, Ukraine. Its population is 

Economic activity is predominantly coal mining and the chemical industry. The Horlivka Institute for Foreign Languages has a two-building campus in the city centre.

The city was severely damaged during the 2014 Battle of Horlivka of the war in Donbas, and again during the Eastern Ukraine campaign of the ongoing Russian invasion of Ukraine (2022–present). Since 2014, it has been mainly under the control of pro-Russian forces.

History

In 1779, the city was founded as Gosudarev Posad and in 1869 it was renamed after Pyotr Gorlov as Gorlovka. The workers' town provided basic services to and organization of a series of mining camps. During the Russian Revolution of 1905, it was the scene of an armed uprising.

In April 1918, troops loyal to the Ukrainian People's Republic took control of Horlivka. Subsequently, under Soviet control, by the 1930s it had expanded considerably and become a major center for mining operations in the Ukrainian SSR.

The city was occupied by German troops from 1941 to 1943. During World War II retreating Nazis burned buildings and perpetrated mass shootings. Nonetheless, the city's population had risen to over 400,000 by the end of the war. In recent years many mines have closed. The population fell by more than ten percent during the 1990s.

War in Donbas

In the middle of April 2014, and shortly thereafter, pro-Russian separatists captured several towns in Donetsk Oblast. A group of separatists seized the police station in Horlivka on April 14; the city hall was seized on April 30. The mayor of the city, Yevhen Klep, was detained by the separatists on June 11, and not released until July 18. Local chief of police Andriy Kryschenko was captured and badly beaten by the insurgents. A Horlivka city council deputy, Volodymyr Rybak, was kidnapped by the pro-Russian militants on April 17. His body was later found in a river on April 22. The city administration building was seized on April 30, solidifying separatist control over Horlivka. Self-proclaimed mayor of Horlivka Volodymyr Kolosniuk was arrested by the SBU on suspicion of participation in "terrorist activities" on July 2.

On July 21 and 22, 2014, the city saw heavy fighting. The Ukrainian army reportedly retook parts of Horlivka on July 21. After the Ukrainian army had retaken Lysychansk on July 25, 2014, the recapture of Horlivka became a priority, for the city was seen as "a direct path to the regional center – Donetsk". As of July 28, the city was reported to be fully surrounded by Ukrainian troops, with rebels holding their positions inside. However, Horlivka continued to be controlled by separatist forces. As of June 2015 it was situated ten kilometers from the war front. Suburbs of Horlivka stayed under Ukrainian army control. In November 2017 they regained control of the villages of Travneve and Hladosove north of Horlivka.

As reported by the city administration, from the beginning of the conflict until late January 2015, 274 local civilians were wounded and 92 killed, including nine children. Because of the conflict the city's population shrank to 180,000.

In late March 2019, according to Ukrainian media reports, Ukrainian army mine clearance specialist Andriy Shor, who participated in both battles for the Donetsk Airport and the Battle of Pisky, announced on Facebook that the Ukrainian army had recently taken control of Horlivka city. Unian reported that Ukrainian forces had secured the outskirts of the city and are slowly advancing further towards the center of Horlivka, citing Ukrainian volunteer Yuriy Mysiahin. In May the separatists tried to push the Ukrainian forces back, but failed.

As of 2020, the majority of the town remains under separatist control. In June 2020, the former head of DPR propaganda in Horlivka handed himself to SBU.

2022 Horlivka offensive 
In 2022, Ukrainian reports claimed there was a military offensive in the city.

On 15 September 2022, the Intelligence Directorate under the Ukrainian Ministry of Defence reported that the occupying Russian forces have "mobilised" 6,000 local residents leaving Horlivka devoid of male population of military age. 

On 14 November 2022, the Russian Armed Forces claimed to have forced the remaining units of the Ukrainian Army out of the northern Mayors'k district. The claim was repudiated by the spokesperson of Ukraine's Operational Command East Serhii Cherevatyi, who claimed that the area remains contested.

Demographics
Ethnic composition as of the Ukrainian Census of 2001:

First language as of the Ukrainian Census of 2001:
Russian 85.1%
Ukrainian 13.9%
Belarusian 0.1%
Armenian 0.1%

Culture 
The Museum of the City History, the Art Museum (the largest collection of paintings by N. Roerich in Ukraine), the Miniature Book Museum by V.A. Razumov (the only state in the world). 62 out of 84 comprehensive schools (29,700 students, 7,000 teachers), 55 kindergartens (5,700 children), 19 out of 25 houses of culture and clubs, 7 parks, 29 libraries, 7 cinemas.

Infrastructure and environment
Despite the fall of communism a statue of Lenin still stands in a central square bearing his name. Horlivka is well served by CNG-buses (see Natural gas vehicle), but much of the city's Soviet-era infrastructure shows signs of deterioration. By contrast, a number of modern shops and a new cathedral (completed 2014) in the town center indicate some rejuvenation.

On the eastern side of Horlivka there is an abandoned chemical plant which used to produce toxic explosives and has been reported to be in a dangerous condition. Mining activity has resulted in large spoil tips being visible around the city, but a tree planting project and ongoing forestry maintenance has revitalised an area to the north.

The city was severely damaged during the war in Donbas.

Administrative divisions

The city is divided into three city districts: Mykytivka, Kalinin, and City Center.

The city municipality also includes several towns and villages. Most of populated places belongs to the City Center district, while Hladosove, Holmivsky and Zaitseve is part of Mykytivka district.
 urban-type settlements: Holmivsky, Zaitseve, Panteleymonivka
 villages: Mykhailivka, Ryasne
 hamlets: Hladosove, Ozeryanivka, Piatykhatky, Stavky, Fedorivka, Shyroka Balka

Notable people
Sergei Baranov, Russian volleyball player
 Yuriy Boyko, Ukrainian politician
 Valeriy Horbunov, Ukrainian and Soviet football player
 Jinjer, Ukrainian metal band
 Nikolai Kapustin, Russian composer and pianist
 Alevtin Osipov, former Kazakh professional football player
 Ihor Petrov, Ukrainian professional football coach and a former player
 Aleksandr Ponomarev, Soviet Ukrainian football player and manager
 Ruslan Ponomariov, Ukrainian chess player
 Serhii Rebrov, Ukrainian footballer
 Oleksandr Savanchuk, Ukrainian football striker
 Arkady Shevchenko, Soviet defector
 Mykyta Shevchenko, Ukrainian football goalkeeper
Evgeny Ukhanov, Ukrainian-Australian pianist
Alexander Volkov, Soviet-Russian cosmonaut

International relations

 
Horlivka is twinned with:

Barnsley, United Kingdom, since 1987
Pensacola, United States
Buffalo, United States, since 2007

Gallery

Notes

References

External links

 Gorlovka Portal
 Gorlovka Vedi
 Video of Gorlovka
 Yellow Pages of Horlivka
 Things to do in Horlivka 

 
Cities in Donetsk Oblast
Populated places established in 1867
Yekaterinoslav Governorate
Cities of regional significance in Ukraine
Populated places established in the Russian Empire
Holocaust locations in Ukraine
1779 establishments in the Russian Empire
Horlivka Raion